The Loerzel Beer Hall, also known as "The Brewery" was built in 1873 at 213 Partition Street in Saugerties, Ulster County, New York.  It was built about 1873, and is a large three-story, brick building.  It measures 45 feet wide and 65 feet deep, and features broad brick gables with lancet openings, a heavy cornice, and decorative cast-iron lintels. It was rehabilitated in 1985. It currently serves as an apartment building.

It was added to the National Register of Historic Places in 2000.

See also

 Beer hall
Brewing

References

Commercial buildings on the National Register of Historic Places in New York (state)
Buildings and structures in Ulster County, New York
National Register of Historic Places in Ulster County, New York
Saugerties, New York
Commercial buildings completed in 1873